Flushing Charter Township is a charter township of Genesee County in the U.S. state of Michigan.  The population was 10,640 at the 2010 census. Flushing Township was rated the 63rd safest community in America with a population over 10,000 by SafeWise, a home security and safety brand, in 2017.

Communities
Retiring after twenty years of U.S. diplomatic service in Spain and Portugal, Thomas Ludwell Lee Brent, a nephew of Virginia Congressman and Senator Richard Brent and grandson of Virginia colonial statesman Thomas Ludwell Lee, bought a large tract of land here and settled on it. In 1837, his workers built a mill on the Charlotte Creek, which was named for his daughter, but was later renamed Brent Creek. A post office named Brent Creek was established on November 2, 1888 with Frank J. Browne as the first postmaster. The spelling was changed to Brentcreek on June 25, 1894.

History

In the fall of 1835, Rufus Harrison was the first settler in the future Flushing Township. Flint Township was organized in 1836 and included the township areas of Burton, Clayton, Flushing, Mt. Morris, Genesee, Thetford, Vienna and Montrose.  Genesee and Flushing Townships were split off on March 6, 1838. Flushing Township originally included survey townships of 7 & 8 North in Range 5 East and the west half of 7 & 8 North in Range 6 East.  At a meeting at Ezekiel R. Ewing's house, Dover was proposed by Ebenezer French as the township's name.  However, since another Dover Township already existed in the state, the Michigan legislature chose Flushing. With a loss of early records, only the identity of the first clerk, Abiel C. Bliss, is known.  In October, 1838, the Township was divided into five school districts and appointed two school inspectors, Abiel C. Bliss and Jarvis Bailey.

He built a saw mill and dam, which was destroyed by a freshet, in Section 3 on the Flint River. He thus found the Brent Creek community.

In the 1840, the "English Settlement" started to form in the Township's northwest area with settlers from England. The Village of Flushing was platted that same year, 1840. Clayton Township (survey township 7N 5E) was split off in 1846.  In 1855, the West half of survey township 8 North in Range 6 East was reunited with the East half to form Mt. Morris Township. The Flushing community was incorporated as a village on March 21, 1877.

On December 22, 1951, a B-29 Superfortress crashed onto the farm of Crerston E. Sammons, off Beecher Road. The bomber was on a routine navigational training flight from Minneapolis to its home base at Griffiss Field at Rome, New York when its engines failed. The dead pilot, 1st Lieutenant Robert Phelps of Andover, New Hampshire, was found near the wreckage with his body wrapped within his parachute. Phelps is credited with steering the crippled aircraft away from residential areas and preventing further loss of life. The seven other crew members parachuted to safety.

On Monday November 27, 2017, the northern loop set of municipalities, including Flushing, began receiving water from the Karegnondi Water Authority pipeline and treated by Genesee County Drain Commission Water and Waste Division.

Government
Flushing city's Flushing Fire Department is the on call fire fighting service for the Township and has automatic and mutual aid agreements with Montrose, Mt. Morris and Swartz Creek Area Fire Departments . The Flushing Township Police Department provides police coverage 24 hours a day and provides a school resource officer, who is also a K9 handler, to Flushing Community Schools. The township receives water from the Karegnondi Water Authority pipeline treated by Genesee County Drain Commission Water and Waste Division.

Flushing is part of the following:
 Genesee County Commissioner District 7
 Michigan House of Representatives District 49
 State Senate District 32
 67th District Court Division 1
 Michigan's 5th Congressional District
 Genesee District Library

Educational services are primarily provided by Flushing Community Schools, while small parts of the township are served by Montrose Community Schools and Clio Area School District.

Geography

Demographics
As of the census of 2010, there were 10,640 people, 4,007 households, and 3,047 families residing in the township. The racial makeup of the township was 98.4% White, 2.1% African American, 0.6% Native American, 0.8% Asian, and 1.6% from two or more races. Hispanic or Latino of any race were 2.4% of the population.

Of 4,007 households, 30.7% had children under the age of 18 living with them, 62.4% were married couples living together, 9.4% had a female householder with no husband present, 4.2% had a male householder with no wife present, and 24% were non-families. The average household size was 2.6 and the average family size was 3.0.

References

External links
Flushing Charter Township

Townships in Genesee County, Michigan
Charter townships in Michigan
1838 establishments in Michigan
Populated places established in 1838